The 2003 Pacific Life Pacific-10 Conference men's basketball tournament was played between March 13 and March 15, 2003, at Staples Center in Los Angeles, California.  The champion of the tournament was Oregon, which received the Pac-10's automatic bid to the NCAA tournament. Upsets defined this tournament, and for the first time, neither Arizona nor UCLA were in the final game. The Most Outstanding Player was Luke Ridnour of Oregon. It was also the first year that longtime sponsor of the tournament, Pacific Life, sponsored the event.

Seeds
The top eight Pacific-10 schools play in the tournament.  Teams are seeded by conference record, with a tiebreaker system used to seed teams with identical conference records.

Bracket

Tournament notes

 This tournament opened with the lowest seed, UCLA, stunning top seed and No. 1 ranked Arizona 96–89 in overtime. The second game had another upset with 5 seed Oregon beating 4 seed Arizona State. The upsets continued into the next session with the 7 seed USC beating 2 seed Stanford 79–74. The fourth upset was when USC defeated 3 seed California. 
 The championship game featured 5 seed Oregon defeating 7 seed USC 74–66. Oregon, had then become the lowest seed ever to win this tournament (although in later tournaments the 6 seed would win). 
 7 seed USC became the lowest seed ever to make the championship game of the Pac-10 Tournament (still the lowest to date). 
 Also of note, this was the first time that neither of the top two seeds were in the final game, and in fact both the 1 and 2 seeds were knocked out in the first round.
 This is the only Pac-10 Tournament in which neither school from Washington participated.
 Arizona set a record for most field goal attempts in one game with 88 vs. UCLA. (33-of-88) (OT). This tournament record still stands.
 Five teams were invited to the 2003 NCAA Men's Division I Basketball Tournament
 Arizona – 17 1 .944 28–4
 Stanford – 14 4 .778 24–9
 California – 13 5 .722 22–9
 Arizona State – 11 7 .611 20–12
 Oregon – 10 8 .556 23–10

Arizona was the #1 seed in the West Regional bracket.

All tournament team
 Luke Ridnour, Oregon – Tournament MVP
 James Davis, Oregon
 Luke Jackson, Oregon
 Desmon Farmer, USC
 Rory O'Neil, USC
 Ray Young, UCLA

References

2007–08 Pac-10 Men's Basketball Media Guide pages 50–60 (PDF copy available at 2007–08 Pac-10 Men's Basketball Media Guide)

2002–03 Pacific-10 Conference men's basketball season
Pac-12 Conference men's basketball tournament